The 1984 Champ Car season may refer to:
 the 1983–84 USAC Championship Car season, which included one race in 1984, the 68th Indianapolis 500 
 the 1984 CART PPG Indy Car World Series, sanctioned by CART, who would later become Champ Car